Arena is a cultural centre in Vienna, Austria. From its 1970s origins in an abandoned former slaughterhouse used for the Vienna Festival, the Arena grew into a centre for alternative culture. It is located at Baumgasse 80 in the Landstraße district.

History

The Arena traces its origin to when the director of the Vienna Festival (German: Wiener Festwochen), Ulrich Baumgartner, hosted theatre and cabaret productions from across Europe in the Museum of the 20th Century (Museum des 20. Jahrhunderts), which is now the 21er Haus. In 1975, the Arena moved to a derelict former slaughterhouse (Auslandsschlachthof for performances of Jérôme Savary's Grand Magic Circus.

Soon after, some of the structures within the vast campus of the slaughterhouse were slated for demolition. On June 27, 1976, when the performances of a musical ended their run at the Arena, the audience was encouraged to stay and squat in the buildings. A banner was unveiled which said "Staying here is solidarity" (German: Hierbleiben ist Solidarität. There were around 700 activists, who called themselves Arenauten. Throughout July, participants organised cafés, a cinema, a women's house, a kids' house, a university and a theatre. A city newspaper was founded which is still in existence (der Falter. More than a thousand people lived on the site, which had 12 buildings and was about the same size as Christiania in Copenhagen. After performing there, Leonard Cohen called it "the best place to be in Vienna." A summer party drew 8,000 people. All the events were free and received favourable coverage by the mainstream media.

Thousands of people attended events until October, when the Arena was relinquished, as a result of both internal squabbles and pressure from the City Council. Two days later, it was mostly demolished, but the council tolerated the squatters staying in one remaining building, namely the domestic abattoir (Inlandschlachthof.

Alongside other still existing projects such as the Amerlingerhaus, Ernst-Kirchweger-Haus and WUK (Werkstätten und Kulturhaus), the Arena is a product of the 1970s and 1980s autonomous movement in Vienna.

Activities

The Arena has become an important centre for alternative culture in Vienna, hosting concerts, exhibitions and an open-air cinema in the courtyard. As well as the large hall, which has hosted bands like Arctic Monkeys and Sonic Youth, there are two smaller rooms for events.

In popular culture 
 In 1977, Josef Aichholzer, Ruth Beckermann and Franz Grafl made a film called Arena Besetzt about the 1976 occupation of the Arena.

References

Bibliography

External links
 Official website

1976 establishments in Austria
Adaptive reuse of industrial structures
Autonomism
Cultural centers
Culture in Vienna
Music venues in Austria
Squats
20th-century architecture in Austria